Max Mutzke is the debut studio album by German recording artist Max Mutzke. It was released by Rare Records and Warner Music Group on 7 January 2005 in German-speaking Europe after he had won both the talent contest SSDSGPS on the ProSieben late-night talk show TV total and Germany 12 Points!, Germany's national final for the Eurovision Song Contest 2004.

Chiefly written and produced by TV total host Stefan Raab, Max Mutzke includes songs in German and English language and was preceded by the singles "Can't Wait Until Tonight," his ESC entry, and "Schwarz auf weiß." Upon its release, it debuted atop the German Albums Chart and was eventually certified gold by the Bundesverband Musikindustrie (BVMI).

Track listing

Charts

Weekly charts

Year-end charts

Certifications

Release history

References

References
MaxMutzke.de — Official website

2005 debut albums
Max Mutzke albums